Portea alatisepala is a plant species in the genus Portea.

The bromeliad is endemic to Bahia state and to the Atlantic Forest biome (Mata Atlantica Brasileira), located in southeastern Brazil.

References

alatisepala
Endemic flora of Brazil
Flora of Bahia
Flora of the Atlantic Forest
Vulnerable flora of South America